The Voice of Italy is a reality singing competition and Italian version of the international syndication The Voice based on the reality singing competition launched in the Netherlands, created by Dutch television producer John de Mol. The inaugural season was in 2013 with the first episode airing on Rai 2 on March 7, 2013, the series ended on June 7, 2019 after 6 seasons. The show was also broadcast via radio on Radio Rai and RTL 102.5. In the summer of 2020, Rai 1 announced a new version of the show, the format of The Voice Senior on air in autumn with Antonella Clerici as TV host.

It was hosted by the TV actor Fabio Troiano and the four judges were Raffaella Carrà, Noemi, Piero Pelù and Riccardo Cocciante. The winner of the series was Elhaida Dani from Team Cocciante. The program was renewed for a second season with the first episode broadcast on 12 March 2014 with Federico Russo hosting the show. Three of the judges returned; Carrà, Pelù and Noemi, however Riccardo Cocciante was replaced by J-Ax.

Sister Cristina Scuccia triumphed in the 2014 final for Team J-Ax. The nun, Suor Cristina Scuccia, recited the prayer 'Our Father' on stage after winning. On the third season, Raffaella Carrà was replaced by Roby and Francesco Facchinetti as judge, while Fabio Curto was the winner.

In March 2020, Rai 2 announced that they had no plans for a seventh season. In July 2020, Rai 1 announced the senior version of the show, participation is only open for candidates of more than 60 years old, which caused rumours that The Voice of Italy was cancelled to make way for The Voice Senior.

Format 
One of the important premises of the show is the quality of the singing talent. Four coaches, themselves popular performing artists, train the talents in their group and occasionally perform with them. Talents are selected in blind auditions, where the coaches cannot see, but only hear the auditioner.

The series consists of three phases: a blind audition, a battle phase and live performance shows. Four judges/coaches, all noteworthy recording artists, choose teams of contestants through a blind audition process. Each judge has the length of the auditioner's performance (about one minute) to decide if he or she wants that singer on his or her team; if two or more judges want the same singer (as happens frequently), the singer has the final choice of coach.

Each team of singers is mentored and developed by its respective coach. In the second stage, called the battle phase, coaches have two of their team members battle against each other directly by singing the same song together, with the coach choosing which team member to advance from each of four individual "battles" into the first live round. Within that first live round, the surviving acts from each team again compete head-to-head, with a combination of public and jury vote deciding who advances onto the next round.
In the final phase, the remaining contestants (top 8) compete against each other in live broadcasts. The television audience and the coaches have equal say 50/50 in deciding who moves on to the final 4 phase. With one team member remaining for each coach, the (final 4) contestants compete against each other in the final with the outcome decided solely by the public vote.

Coaches and hosts

Coaches 
The four positions in the coaching panel is covered by four singers who are part of the Italian music scene. The original panel consisted of Litfiba singer Piero Pelù, Italian music icons Raffaella Carrà and Riccardo Cocciante and former The X Factor contestant Noemi. After winning as coach in the first season, Cocciante left the show and in the second season and was replaced by rapper J-Ax, former singer of Articolo 31, who was also triumphant at the end of the season with his winner, Cristina Scuccia. In the third season, Raffaella Carrà left the program and her position was filled by the father-and-son duo Roby and Francesco Facchinetti, the first-ever duo coach on the show. The fourth season saw the return of Carrà and the arrival of three new coaches: rapper Emis Killa, former 883 singer Max Pezzali and singer-songwriter Dolcenera. At the end of the fourth season, Carrà announced that she was leaving the program forever. None of the season four coaches returned for the next season. In November 2017, Al Bano announced his retirement as well as his new role as a coach on the fifth season. Francesco Renga and Cristina Scabbia were also confirmed as coaches for season five, along with returning coach J-Ax. The sixth season in 2019 again saw the total renewal of the panel, with new coaches Elettra Lamborghini, Gigi D'Alessio, Gué Pequeno and Morgan, who was previously a judge on The X Factor.

Hosts
In the first season, the host was actor Fabio Troiano, with radio host Carolina Di Domenico serving at the liveshows in the role of V-Reporter. From the second to the fourth edition, radio and television presenter Federico Russo hosted the program, while the part relating to the web is entrusted to his colleague Valentina Correani from season two to three. Correani was replaced in the fourth edition by Alessandra "Angelina" Angeli. In the fifth edition, Federico Russo was replaced by Costantino della Gherardesca, who assumed all the duties of the main and backstage host. In the sixth season, Simona Ventura was announced as the new host.

 Key
 Main presenter
 Backstage presenter

Coaches and finalists 
Color key
 Winner
 Runner-up
 Third place
 Fourth place

Season summary
Warning: the following table presents a significant amount of different colors.

Senior spin-off 

From November 27, 2020, a spin-off of the program, The Voice Senior, was broadcast on Rai 1, where competitors over the age of 60 participate.

Kids version
The Voice Kids is the spin-off where kids ages 7–14 will participate. The coaches for the first season were the coaches from the third season of The Voice Senior which is Gigi D'Alessio, Loredana Bertè, Clementino and Ricchi e Poveri to be presented by Antonella Clerici.

Coaches and finalists
Color key
Winner in bold, finalists in italic.
 Winner
 Finalist

References

2013 Italian television series debuts
2019 Italian television series endings
i
Italian reality television series
RAI original programming